Cannonball Blitz is a game programmed by Olaf Lubeck for the Apple II and published by On-Line Systems in 1982. It was ported to the VIC-20 and TI-99/4A computers. An historic military spin on Donkey Kong, rolling cannonballs replace barrels, a soldier stands in for the large ape, and the objective of the first level is a flag rather than a kidnapped girl.

Gameplay
There are three different screens, the third of which is particularly challenging. After completing the third level, the player views a small celebration scene and then restarts at the first level. Repeated levels only differ from those of the first round in the harsher timing patterns of the game.

Development
Cannonball Blitz achieved some notoriety in the Apple hacking community as being difficult to crack. Track 17, sector D of the game contains the message "YOU'LL NEVER CRACK IT".

Reception
Ron Brinkmann reviewed the game for Computer Gaming World, and stated that "In the final analysis, Cannonball Blitz is a game every bit as challenging and fun as the arcade original. It will give you hours (days, months, years) of enjoyment."

Ahoy! wrote that "Cannonball Blitz [for the VIC-20], make no mistake about it, is Donkey Kong in dress blues. Not a bloody thing new here. However, you're going to find it a barrel of fun". The magazine favorably reviewed the animation and the "unbelievable" sound effects, and concluded that it was "a very good version of a fine game".

References

1982 video games
Apple II games
VIC-20 games
Platform games
Sierra Entertainment games
TI-99/4A games
Video game clones
Video games developed in the United States
Single-player video games